The men's double sculls competition at the 2018 Asian Games was held on 19–23 August at the JSC Lake.

Schedule 
All times are Western Indonesia Time (UTC+07:00)

Results

Heats 
 Qualification: 1–2 → Final A (FA), 3–5 → Repechage (R)

Heat 1

Heat 2

Repechage
 Qualification: 1–2 → Final A (FA), 3–5 → Final B (FB)

Finals

Final B

Final A

References

External links
Rowing at the 2018 Asian Games

Rowing at the 2018 Asian Games